William Donald Hudson, who published as W. D. Hudson (1920-2003) was an English Baptist minister and philosopher. He wrote on ethics, philosophy of religion, and the philosophy of Wittgenstein.

References

1920 births
2003 deaths
20th-century English Baptist ministers
20th-century English philosophers